Walton Rehabilitation Hospital is a non-profit rehabilitation center located in Augusta, Georgia, United States which has won numerous awards for the quality of its healthcare. The hospital was founded in 1988 and is one component of the Walton Rehabilitation Health System. This hospital offers both inpatient and outpatient programs to teens and adults and assesses disabling illnesses, stroke, head injuries, spinal injuries, and orthopedic injuries. Walton is the only specialized provider of rehabilitation in the Central Savannah River Area of Georgia. Its published mission is to "enhance the quality of life for people with acquired disabilities."

Walton Rehabilitation Center cares for more stroke patients than any other hospital in Georgia each year. Transitional living services at Walton help brain injury patients' transition from inpatient rehab and help prepare them for readjusting to home life. More than 50% of Walton's nurses are CRRN-certified. Each physician at Walton is either board-certified and/or fellowship-trained. When it comes to patients, the main focus is on regaining movement, function, and independence. In addition to rehabilitation services, Walton offers Behavioral Medicine services.

Location and design
The hospital is located on the border of Georgia and South Carolina. Other medical facilities in the area include the Medical College of Georgia, University Health System, and the Augusta VA Medical Center. Walton is a single story facility to help accommodate patients with physical disabilities and rehab patients.

Accreditations and awards
The hospital is accredited by the Joint Commission and the Commission of Accreditation of Rehabilitation Facilities, as well as special accreditation for stroke rehabilitation. In 2002, Walton received the Georgia Hospital Association Community Leadership Award. The following year, Walton received the Magnolia Award for Excellence. In 2007, Walton received the NAHMA's Communities of Quality awards for the Development for the Elderly and the Development for Residents with Special Needs.

Hospital stats
 Accepts Medicare and/or Medicaid
 Accreditation: JCAHO
 Total Certified Beds: 58

References

External links
 

Hospital buildings completed in 1970
Hospitals in Augusta, Georgia
1988 establishments in Georgia (U.S. state)
Rehabilitation hospitals
Hospitals established in 1988